The Jewish Cemetery in Tarnogród was probably established in 1588. Located to the east of the synagogue, it covered an area of 1.8 hectares. During World War II, the Nazi Germans occupying Poland desacrated and destroyed the cemetery. A few decades after the end of the war, from 1986 until 1990, the cemetery was renovated and partly surrounded by a wall to mark and protect it. Around 100 pieces of recovered tombstones were placed within the area. Some of the tombstones were embedded into the wall, becoming the so-called "commemoration wall". There is a monument to the memory of Poles of Jewish origin from Tarnogród who were murdered by the Germans in 1942.

Notes

Bibliography 
 
 A map of Leżajsk by the Polish Military Geographical Institute  47th strip 35th pole Warsaw of 1938.

External links 
 The Jewish cemetery in Tarnogród in the Polish Virtual Shtetl site.
 Pictures of the cemetery  in the Cmentarze żydowskie site (pl.)

Jewish cemeteries in Poland
Buildings and structures in Tarnogród
Holocaust locations in Poland